Sébastien Lombard (born 20 August 1981) is a French former professional footballer who played as a goalkeeper-

In June 2021 SC Bastia announced that Lombard would retire and join the club's staff as assistant manager. A year later in 2022, he remained as part of the staff, and was integrated to the reserve squad as a starting goalkeeper, to help the youth players after gaining promotion.

References

External links
 
 

1981 births
Living people
Association football goalkeepers
French footballers
Ligue 2 players
Championnat National players
Championnat National 2 players
Championnat National 3 players
FC Martigues players
Gazélec Ajaccio players
SC Toulon players
CA Bastia players
AS Furiani-Agliani players
SC Bastia players
Footballers from Nice